Pierrefonds Airport  is an airport located  west-northwest of Saint-Pierre in Réunion. It is the smaller of the two airports located on the island, Roland Garros Airport being the other.

In 2008, the airport served 135,000 passengers

Facilities

Airlines and destinations

Statistics

See also
 Roland Garros Airport

References

External links 
 Aéroport de la Réunion Saint Pierre Pierrefonds (official site)
 Aéroport de Saint-Pierre - Pierrefonds (Union des Aéroports Français) 
 

Airports in Réunion